Garlic mustard (Alliaria petiolata) was introduced to North America as a culinary herb in the 1860s and it is considered an invasive species in much of North America.  it has been documented in most of the Eastern United States and Canada, with scattered populations in the west. It is listed as a noxious or restricted plant in the following states: Alabama, Connecticut, Massachusetts, Minnesota, New Hampshire, Oregon, Vermont, and Washington.  A current map of its distribution in the United States can be found at the Early Detection and Distribution Mapping System (EDDmapS).

The most promising biological control agent, the monophagous weevil Ceutorhynchus scrobicollis, specifically studied since 2002, has been blocked for introduction into the US repeatedly by the USDA Technical Advisory, TAG, group, despite researchers' many petitions for approval.

Invasion biology
Like most invasive plants, once garlic mustard is introduced into a new location, it persists and spreads into undisturbed plant communities. In many areas of its introduction in Eastern North America, it has become the dominant under-story species in woodland and flood plain environments, where eradication is difficult.

The insects and fungi that feed on it in its native habitat are not present in North America, increasing its seed productivity and allowing it to out-compete native plants. It is also toxic to some native insects, such as North American butterflies in the genus Pieris such as Pieris virginiensis and Pieris oleracea.

Garlic mustard produces allelochemicals, mainly in the form of the compounds allyl isothiocyanate and benzyl isothiocyanate, which suppress mycorrhizal fungi that most plants, including native forest trees, require for optimum growth. However, allelochemicals produced by garlic mustard do not affect mycorrhizal fungi from garlic mustard's native range, indicating that this "novel weapon" in the invaded range explains garlic mustard's success in North America. Additionally, because white-tailed deer rarely feed on garlic mustard, large deer populations may help to increase its population densities by consuming competing native plants. Trampling by browsing deer encourages additional seed growth by disturbing the soil. Seeds contained in the soil can germinate up to five years after being produced (and possibly more). The persistence of the seed bank and suppression of mycorrhizal fungi both complicate restoration of invaded areas because long-term removal is required to deplete the seed bank and allow recovery of mycorrhizae.

Garlic mustard produces a variety of secondary compounds including flavonoids, defense proteins, glycosides, and glucosinolates that reduce its palatability to herbivores. In northeastern forests, garlic mustard rosettes increase the rate of native leaf litter decomposition, increasing nutrient availability and possibly creating conditions favorable to garlic mustard's own spread.

Control strategies

Mechanical

Preventing seed production and depletion of the soil seed bank are key to eradicating infestations, but seeds can last as long as twelve years and just one plant can produce thousands of seeds. Seeds are also easily tracked around by animals, vehicles, and people. Non-chemical non-biological control methods include removal by hand-pulling or cutting at the base, mowing, burning, or manipulation of the environment to reduce light.

Pulling is more effective if the entire root is removed and desirable plants and soils are not trampled and compacted. Garlic mustard can invade stable forests as well as disturbed sites. It can grow in deep shade as well as full sunlight and in a wide range of moisture levels. Therefore, management by planting or encouraging other plants to intercept light will not prevent new infestations, although it may slow them. Control is best in early spring prior to flowering because the plants are smaller which reduces soil disturbance and loss from pulling, as well as giving competing plants more of the season to expand. However, it is easy to miss the small plants, which can flower even when less than three inches in above-ground height. The flowers increase visibility, especially in lower light situations. Some plants' roots will also break off, even with careful pulling technique, leaving pieces in the soil that will regrow. Root breakage is most common in soil compacted by foot traffic and in drier conditions. Mowing and cutting are also more effective prior to the plants flowering because the mowed and cut plant pieces are less likely to possess enough energy to bloom and generate viable seed. Removed plants should be bagged (and disposed of correctly) or burned, as seeds or roots may survive composting. Pulled plants can bloom and produce seed, particularly if the roots are attached, even while the plants are withering and dying.

Chemical
Chemical control may be achieved to some extent by foliar application with a number of herbicides, although their use is much more efficacious in highly disturbed situations, like agricultural monocultures or urban and suburban gardens, than in complex settings, like forests and well-established meadows or prairies. Timing herbicide applications to the earliest spring may help to better protect native or desirable plants in the same locations as garlic mustard is generally active earlier than most other plants in northern temperate climates, one of the reasons it can generally outcompete native plants and displace them. However, there are native and desirable plants that are active even before garlic mustard is, and/or at the same time in early spring, such as flowers from the genera Pulsatilla and Helleborus of the family Ranunculaceae. Some native and desirable plants also are evergreen and thus vulnerable to foliar and post-emergent herbicides at all times. Chemical control methods that involve heavy equipment or human trampling can compact soils, affecting all plants negatively. Such methods can disturb wildlife and chemical solutions may cause chemical pollution such as tainted water through runoff.

All non-biological methods of control must be repeated for 2–5 years to be effective—as most infestations occur in sites where a considerable seed bank has been established. Seeds continue to germinate for over a decade. Surviving roots regrow and produce new seed pods, enabling the infestation to potentially be quickly reestablished. Continual reintroduction of garlic mustard to areas where it has been eradicated is also highly likely until an effective biological control situation is established, as the long-lived seeds are produced in great quantities and are readily distributed by animals and human activity.

Biological

Accurately targeted biological control is the method of control that is the least-damaging to ecosystems not typified by monoculture, like forested areas, while also being the most efficient in terms of costs. For the management of some invasive plants, or in some cases when dealing with garlic mustard, herbicide application and human-managed labor such as mowing, tilling, burning, and pulling may be preferred for managing unwanted vegetation on land that is highly disturbed by human activity, such as agricultural land. This effort is usually rendered more effective by the supplemental presence of biological control agents. For more complex ecosystems such as forests, trampling and other physical disturbance such as soil compaction, the spreading of seeds from clothing, chemical toxicity, unwanted non-targeted species damage, demanding human labor, petrochemical consumption, and other factors are eliminated or greatly reduced with effective biological control. One species of weevil that targets garlic mustard, for instance, consumes the seeds. Unlike with some invasive plants which are annuals, such as Microstegium vimineum (Japanese stiltgrass), the mowing of garlic mustard is less effective because it regrows from its tap root, especially if it is mowed in its second, flowering, year — where the root has grown enough to store considerable energy.

Monophagous controllers, such as the weevil Ceutorhynchus scrobicollis, which only feeds on garlic mustard, are usually the most ideal candidates for initial introduction to combat invasive plants, as they greatly reduce the chance that the introduced controller will itself become a pest. Difficulties involved in using biological control are identifying species that are safe to introduce as well as relying on fewer controlling species being present in the non-native ecosystem. Up to 76 things feed on garlic mustard in its native environment. By contrast, nothing eats it to a significant extent in the United States where it is non-native. Despite there being so many controlling agents for that plant, it is currently estimated that adequate control of garlic mustard's invasiveness in portions of the United States where it is problematic can be achieved by the introduction of just two weevils, with C. scrobicollis being the most important of the two.

The example of garlic mustard shows how effective, at least in Minnesota's controlled trials and European field observations, even one monophagous biological control agent can be, while having the fewest costs. Despite the demonstrated effectiveness of C. scrobicollis and, potentially, C. constrictus, the importation and release of biological control agents such as those may be stymied by heavy research and regulation requirements. Those who believe the regulations are well-crafted argue they are needed to prevent the agents from becoming highly undesirable pests while critics argue that the regulations, as currently written and implemented, make it too difficult to bypass more damaging, less effective, and more costly methods of control — such as applying herbicides in forests.  As of May 2017, there is no legally-approved biological control agent to combat garlic mustard in the United States. Garlic mustard has been researched by the United States since the 1990s and C. scrobicollis has been studied specifically since 2002. The 2012 recommendation to release it into the US was blocked by the Technical Advisory Group for Biological Control of Weeds.

Of the 76 natural enemies garlic mustard has in its native range, several have been tested for use as potential biological control agents. Five weevil species from the genus Ceutorhynchus and one flea beetle were selected as candidates during preliminary testing. Since that time, the United States' employees studying these candidates narrowed the list. The monophagous weevil C. scrobicollis, studied since 2002, was officially recommended for introduction into the US in 2012 but the TAG group blocked its introduction, requesting further research be conducted. As of May 2017, it has not been approved for introduction and the continued research funding has not been provided. It was also petitioned by another researcher in 2008, 2011, 2014, and 2016. Additional research was requested by TAG in response to the 2008 petition. It was completed but the petitions continue to be blocked.

References

External links
Least Wanted: Garlic Mustard, Plant Conservation Alliance's Alien Plant Working Group
 Species Profile - Garlic Mustard (Alliaria petiolata), National Invasive Species Information Center, United States National Agricultural Library. Lists general information and resources for Garlic Mustard.
 Most Unwanted – Garlic Mustard (Alliaria petiolata), Ontario Invasive Plant Council. Biological information and resources for Garlic Mustard in Ontario.

Brassicaceae
Invasive plant species in the United States
Invasive plant species in Canada